Eryk is a Polish given name (derived from Erik). Notable people with the name include: 

 Eryk Anders (born 1987), American mixed martial artist
 Eryk Goczał (born 2004), Polish rally driver
 Eryk Hansel (born 1941), Polish footballer
 Eryk Kurnatowski (1883-1975), Polish nobleman and politician
 Eryk Latoń (born 1993), Polish racing cyclist
 Eryk Lipiński (1908-1991), Polish artist
 Eryk Rocha (born 1978), Brazilian film director
 Eryk Williamson (born 1997), American footballer
 Eryk Żelazny (born 1943), Polish runner

Polish masculine given names